Ectoedemia rosae is a moth of the family Nepticulidae. It is found in France (Briançon area) and Norway (Vang).

The wingspan is 4.5–4.7 mm for males and 5.0–5.2 mm for females. The forewings are dark fuscous and coarsely scaled. The hindwings are grey brown. There is one generation per year.

The larvae feed on Rosa tomentosa and probably Rosa majalis. They mine the leaves of their host plant. The mine starts as a much contorted narrow gallery in the underside of the parenchyma, with a thick line of broken brown to black frass. Later, the frass becomes more dispersed and black. In the last instar, the mine suddenly enlarges in a roundish or elongate blotch and becomes a full depth mine. Often, several mines are found on a single leaflet. The exit-slit is located on the upper side. Pupation takes place in a dark fuscous cocoon, spun on leaf litter.

Etymology
The species is named after the host plant genus.

References

Moths described in 2011
Nepticulidae
Moths of Europe